Central Scotland Fire and Rescue Service was the statutory fire and rescue service for the area of Central Scotland, Scotland between 1975 and 2013. It was amalgamated into the single Scottish Fire and Rescue Service in 2013.

History
Central Scotland Fire and Rescue Service was formed in 1975 when control of fire services was passed from local authorities to the new Central Region Council. When the Central Regional Council was abolished in 1996 the three new unitary authorities each took part in the running of the service. Originally called Central Region Fire Brigade in 1975, changed in 1996 to Central Scotland Fire Brigade and in 2004 it changed to Central Scotland Fire and Rescue Service to reflect the change in the operations it carried out.

Central Scotland Fire and Rescue Service, along with the other seven fire and rescue services across Scotland, was amalgamated into a single, new Scottish Fire and Rescue Service on 1 April 2013. This replaced the previous system of eight regional fire and rescue services across Scotland which existed since 1975. The Scottish Fire and Rescue Service has its headquarters in Perth.

Stations
The service operated 17 fire stations.

One Wholetime Station: Stirling.
Four Mixed Wholetime/Retained Stations: Alloa, Bo'ness, Falkirk and Larbert.
Twelve Retained Stations: Aberfoyle, Balfron, Bridge of Allan, Callander, Denny, Doune, Dunblane, Killin, Slamannan, Tyndrum, Crianlarich and Tillicoultry.
No volunteer stations.

Appliances
Central Scotland Fire and Rescue Service had a total of 34 fire appliances which cover the whole area of Stirling, Falkirk and Clackmannanshire. The majority of these are water tender ladder and the remainder were mostly specialist units:
17 Water tender Ladders
5 Water Tenders
2 Light Fire Appliances – (changed from VSU as unit are no longer volunteers)
1 Rescue Tender
1 Operational Support Unit
2 Fire Fogging Units
1 Water Carrier
1 Aerial Ladder Platforms
1 Prime Mover + High Volume Pump, Hose pod & Environmental Pod
1 Incident Response Unit
1 Command Unit
1 Fire Investigation Unit
1 Water Rescue Unit
1 Emergency Firefighting Appliance Driving Training Vehicle
Urban Search and Rescue Team – USAR + USAR pod

Regional Fire and Rescue Services in Scotland 1975-2013
The following eight regional fire and rescue services (originally known as fire brigades) were merged on 1 April 2013, creating the Scottish Fire and Rescue Service:
Central Scotland Fire and Rescue Service
Dumfries and Galloway Fire and Rescue Service
Fife Fire and Rescue Service
Grampian Fire and Rescue Service
Highlands and Islands Fire and Rescue Service
Lothian and Borders Fire and Rescue Service
Strathclyde Fire and Rescue Service
Tayside Fire and Rescue Service

The same boundaries were also used for the eight territorial police forces, which were amalgamated into Police Scotland on 1 April 2013.

See also
Blues and twos
Fire Services in Scotland
FireControl
Fire apparatus
Fire engine
Fire
Fire and Rescue Authority (Scotland)

References

External links
Official website for Central Scotland Fire and Rescue Service

Fire and rescue services of Scotland
Falkirk (council area)
Stirling (council area)
Clackmannanshire
Organisations based in Falkirk (council area)